Clivina kubor is a species of ground beetle in the subfamily Scaritinae. It was described by Darlington in 1971.

References

kubor
Beetles described in 1971